Mark Victor Hansen (born January 8, 1948) is an American inspirational and motivational speaker, trainer and author. He is best known as the founder and co-creator of the Chicken Soup for the Soul book series.

Early life
Hansen was born to Danish immigrants, Una and Paul Hansen. He grew up in Waukegan, Illinois. He graduated from Southern Illinois University in 1970 with a B.A. in speech communications.

Publications
Along with business partner Jack Canfield, Hansen is best known for creating what Time magazine called "the publishing phenomenon of the decade". Chicken Soup for the Soul books are one of the most successful publishing franchises in the world today, with more than 500 million books sold internationally and more than 100 licensed products. The name "Chicken Soup" was chosen because of the use of chicken soup as a home remedy for the sick. The first Chicken Soup book, published by Health Communications, Inc., sold more than 2 million copies. There are now over 500 million copies in print and in 54 languages worldwide.

In 2005, he co-wrote the book Cracking the Millionaire Code along with Robert Allen, in which he highlights several self-made millionaires such as Bob Circosta, Michael Dell, Bill Gates, Alexander Graham Bell, Oprah Winfrey, and others as examples of how to build wealth.

In 2006, Hansen co-wrote the book How to Make the Rest of your Life The Best of your Life with Art Linkletter. In 2010, Hansen co-authored the book Cash in a Flash with Robert Allen as the sequel to the New York Times bestseller The One Minute Millionaire.

Appearances
Hansen has appeared on Oprah, CNN and The Today Show and was featured in Time, U.S. News & World Report, USA Today, The New York Times and Entrepreneur Magazine.

He has also appeared on TV infomercials, talking with and supporting Anthony Morrison, who introduced his internet product.

In 2008, Hansen partnered with Tom Black to give a series of one-day seminars on sales.

Recognition

In 2004 Hansen was inducted into the Sales & Marketing Executive International’s Hall of Fame, receiving the Ambassador of Free Enterprise award.  He is also the recipient of the 2004 Visionary Philanthropist for Youth Award by Covenant House of CA.

In 2002 The University of Toledo presented Hansen with an Honorary PhD in Business Administration and established the Mark Victor Hansen Entrepreneurial Excellence Fund that will help shape the minds of future business leaders and assist in the development of the faculty who will teach them.

In 2000 The Horatio Alger Association of Distinguished Americans honored Hansen with the prestigious Horatio Alger Award as an American leader who personifies the virtues and principles inherent in the success stories written by nineteenth-century American author Horatio Alger Jr.

In 2000 Northwood University honored Hansen as the Outstanding Business Leader of the Year.

 Orange County Register, February 17, 2009.</ref> Mark remarried to Crystal Dwyer Hansen.

Charity work
Hansen is involved in and supports charities such as Horatio Alger Scholarships, Habitat for Humanity, American Red Cross, Operation Smile, Oceana, March of Dimes, Covenant House and Childhelp.

References

External links

1948 births
Living people
American people of Danish descent
American motivational writers
American motivational speakers
American self-help writers
Southern Illinois University alumni
People from Waukegan, Illinois
Writers from Illinois